Serishabad (also Romanized as Serīshābād; also known as Sehrīshābād) is a city and capital of Serishabad District, in Qorveh County, Kurdistan Province, Iran. At the 2011 census, its population was 8,115.

Language 
Linguistic composition of the city.

References 

Towns and villages in Qorveh County
Cities in Kurdistan Province
Azerbaijani settlements in Kurdistan Province